Ignacio Bustamante (born 30 August 1965) is an Argentine freestyle skier. He competed in the men's moguls event at the 1992 Winter Olympics.

References

External links
 

1965 births
Living people
Argentine male freestyle skiers
Olympic freestyle skiers of Argentina
Freestyle skiers at the 1992 Winter Olympics
Sportspeople from Bariloche